Acoustic EP may refer to:

Acoustic EP (Coldplay EP)
Acoustic EP (3 Doors Down EP)
Acoustic EP (10 Years EP), by 10 Years (band)
Acoustic EP (Daphne Loves Derby EP)
Acoustic EP (People in Planes EP)
A bonus EP with the album 13 Ways to Bleed on Stage by Cold
Against Me! (2001), a self-titled release by Against Me! also known as The Acoustic EP

See also
Acoustic (disambiguation)